Dorel Zaharia (born 21 February 1978, in Constanța) is a former Romanian football striker.

He was Gloria Bistriţa's top scorer in the 2006–07 season with 11 goals, and the Intertoto Cup he scored a goal against Atlético Madrid, Gloria winning with 2–1. He scored another goal, but this time in a 2–1 loss at the Emirates Stadium against Arsenal in his Steaua's time.

Honours
Granitul Babadag
Liga IV – Constanța County: 2013–14
Farul Constanța
Liga III: 2017–18
Liga IV – Constanța County: 2016–17

References

External links
 
 

1978 births
Living people
Association football forwards
Sportspeople from Constanța
Romanian footballers
Liga I players
FC Brașov (1936) players
FC UTA Arad players
FC Steaua București players
FCV Farul Constanța players
FC Unirea Urziceni players
ACF Gloria Bistrița players
CS Portul Constanța players
Levadiakos F.C. players
ASA 2013 Târgu Mureș players
Expatriate footballers in Greece
Romanian expatriate footballers
AFC Săgeata Năvodari players